The AFC Cranes are an American football team located in the Tsurumi-ku, Yokohama, Japan.  They are a member of the X-League.

Team history
1987 Team founded by TOA Corporation employees. 
1994 Joined the X-League X3 division as the TOA Corporation Cranes.
2001 Promoted from X3 to X2.
2009 Finished 1st in the X2 East division (4 wins, 2 losses). Declined participation in the X2-X1 promotion match due to circumstances.
2012 New sponsorship agreement with Taiyo Building management. Team renamed the Taiyo Building Mgmt. Cranes.
2013 Finished 1st in the X2 East division (5 wins, 2 losses). Won X2-X1 promotion match against the Tokyo MPD Eagles 17-16. Promoted to X1 for the following season. 
2014 Finished 6th in the X1 Central division (0 wins, 8 losses). Lost X1-X2 replacement game against the Tokyo MPD Eagles 14-29. Demoted to X2 for the following season.
2015 Taiyo Building management ends team sponsorship. Team is renamed the AFC Cranes.

Seasons

References

External links
  (Japanese)

American football in Japan
1987 establishments in Japan
American football teams established in 1987
X-League teams